Tennis at the 2015 African Games in Brazzaville was held between September 11–18, 2015.

Medal summary

Medals table

References

2015 African Games
2015
African Games